Ak Bars Arena (formerly known as Kazan Arena) is a stadium in Kazan, Russia.  It was completed in July 2013, and hosts football matches, especially FC Rubin Kazan's home games in the Russian Premier League. The stadium has the largest outside screen in the world. Its capacity is around 45,379.

History

The stadium was constructed for the 2013 Summer Universiade. On May 5, 2010, president Putin held the groundbreaking ceremony. The construction of the stadium was completed in 2013. The total cost was 15.5 billion rubles. The stadium hosted the 2013 Summer Universiade opening and closing ceremonies, and 2017 FIFA Confederations Cup. On August 17, 2014 the first football match of the Russian Championship was hosted in the Ak Bars Arena.  

The 16th FINA World Championships were held in Kazan, with some events held at the Arena. It saw twelve swimming records.

In the 2018 FIFA World Cup, the stadium hosted six matches, including the ones where three past champions (Germany, Argentina, and Brazil) were eliminated from the tournament.

UEFA announced in March 2020 that thould host the 2023 UEFA Super Cup.

Design
The architectural concept has been designed by Populous; according to lead designer Damon Lavelle, the stadium is a unique response to the local culture and place. As a multiple-purpose venture, Ak Bars Arena can be used as football matches and other sporting events, cultural events concerts. With a capacity of 45,379 seats and 28 ha stadium territory, Ak Bars Arena is one of the UEFA´s highest category stadium. The stadium has also 72 skyboxes and a fitness center. The general design stage: "TatInvestGrazhdanProekt", "Intex", "TsNIIpromzdany". It replaced Central Stadium as Kazan's main football stadium.

2017 FIFA Confederations Cup

2018 FIFA World Cup

Gallery

References

External links

 Official website
 Stadium information
 Stadium construction progress
 Gallery with pictures of the stadium on Sports.ru

FC Rubin Kazan
Sport in Kazan
2018 FIFA World Cup stadiums
Buildings and structures in Kazan
Sports venues completed in 2013
2017 FIFA Confederations Cup stadiums
2013 establishments in Russia